Aurat (Woman) is a 1953 Hindi movie produced by Munshiram Varma and directed by Bhagwan Das Varma.

The film stars Prem Nath, Bina Rai and Purnima.

Plot
In Aurat's retelling of the Samson and Delilah tale, the plot begins with an introduction to Adil (Prem Nath), who plays Samson in this Hindi-language version.  Adil is a man of gigantic strength who lives in a village with his widowed mother.  One day, the military commander (Hiralal) of the king (Ulhas), comes to Adil’s village and informs the villagers that they will need to perform forced labor to build a new palace for the king.

During the confrontations that take place, Adil drives the commander and his allies away but, in the process, an old man dies. As Adil cradles the dying man, he promises him he will take care of his daughter Ruhi (Purnima). Subsequently, Ruhi moves in with Adil and his mother and, as time passes, Ruhi falls in love with Adil.

The story picks up with the introduction of Juhi (Bina Rai), who is betrothed to the king and will be playing Delilah. On a hunting trip, Juhi and the king are separated; a lion appears from a cave and starts stalking Juhi.  Adil, who happens to be in the area, single-handedly wrestles with the lion and rescues the king's betrothed from the lion. This earns him the gratitude of the beautiful Queen-in-waiting, Juhi. The king, pleased with Adil, gives him an important assignment in his army, and promises that Adil's fellow-villagers will not face forced labour from his army.

Juhi is impressed by Adil and over time this impression turns to love, and she tells Adil about this. Adil does not think it appropriate for a betrothed to be his lover and wife, and spurns her.

Infuriated by Adil's response, Juhi starts to plot against Adil, by getting the king to once again impose forced labour from Adil's village. This angers Adil, who goes to confront the king and the queen-in-waiting. The king dismisses Adil, and orders his arrest. Adil flees to the hills. Numerous attempts by the king's armies to apprehend Adil are in vain. Finally, Juhi tells the king that she will bring Adil back and make him her prisoner.

When the king agrees, Juhi goes off to the hill where Adil is camping and sets up camp over there with her maid, Yasmin (Roopmala).  Adil finds Juhi in the camp and gradually succumbs to her charms, falling in love with her.  While spending time together, he confesses to her that the secret to his strength was his long hair which, if cut, would make him lose his strength.  So, Juhi drugs Adil and while he his fast asleep, she cuts his hair and hands him to the king’s guards. 
The movie progresses in this retelling of the Samson and Delilah tale, apprising audiences with what ultimately happens to Adil, Juhi, Ruhi and the king.

Cast
 Bina Rai as Juhi
 Prem Nath as Adil 
 Purnima as Ruhi
 Ulhas as The King 
 Hiralal as the Military Commander
 Roopmala as Yasmin

Soundtrack
Music was composed by Shankar Jaikishan, while Hasrat Jaipuri and Shailendra wrote the lyrics.

Trivia 
Prem Nath and Bina Rai fell in love during the filming of Aurat and got married soon after. Also, the year following the release of Aurat, Bhagwan Das Varma married Purnima, who played an important role on Aurat as well as earlier films made by Varma Films.

Aurat is a re-working of the Biblical tale of Samson and Delilah.

Aurat was released shortly after the release of the Hollywood film Samson and Delilah directed by Cecil B. DeMille. Unlike its Hollywood version, Aurat was not successful at the box office.

References

External links 
 

1953 films
1950s Hindi-language films
Films scored by Shankar–Jaikishan
Indian black-and-white films
Films about Samson
Films based on the Hebrew Bible
Christian mass media in India